John Wright (27 November 1796 – 18 November 1857) was an English cricketer who was associated with Sheffield Cricket Club and made his first-class debut in 1827. He played for Sheffield from 1822 to 1828.

References

1796 births
1857 deaths
English cricketers
English cricketers of 1826 to 1863
Sheffield Cricket Club cricketers